= Xiaopu (winery) =

Chinese winery

- Native name: 小圃
- Founded: 2017
- Founder: Hongjing "Ian" Dai

Xiaopu (Chinese: 小圃) is a Chinese winery founded in 2017 by Hongjing "Ian" Dai that sources grapes from across six Chinese regions and internationally. Dai subsequently was a founding member of the Young Generation China Wine group.

== History ==
Dai was formerly a wine buyer for Amazon.

Xiaopu sources grapes from Ningxia and Yunnan.

As of 2024, Xiaopu has a portfolio of 30 wines, and has begun exporting wines to Australia, and the United States in 2025.
